Augustine H. Williams (1870 – October 14, 1890) was an American baseball player who was a pitcher for the 1890 Brooklyn Gladiators in the American Association.  He died the same year he made his major league appearances.

External links

1870 births
1890 deaths
Major League Baseball pitchers
19th-century baseball players
Brooklyn Gladiators players
Baseball players from New York (state)
Jersey City Skeeters players
Burials at Calvary Cemetery (Queens)